Siuteroq Nanortalik-43  is a Greenlandic football club based in Nanortalik. Founded 2 November 1943, the team plays in the Greenlandic Football Championship. The club has won its regional Nann-Cup four times but has never won the national championship.

References

Football clubs in Greenland
Association football clubs established in 1943